August 13 - Eastern Orthodox liturgical calendar - August 15

All fixed commemorations below are observed on August 27 by Eastern Orthodox Churches on the Old Calendar.

For August 14, Orthodox Churches on the Old Calendar commemorate the Saints listed on August 1.

Feasts

 Forefeast of the Dormition of the Mother of God.

Saints

 Prophet Micah (8th century BC)  (see also: January 5)
 Martyr Tarcisius, at Rome, under Valerian and Gallienus (c. 253-260)  (see also: August 15)
 Martyr Ursicius, at Illyricum (305- 313)
 Martyr Luke the Soldier, by fire.
 Hieromartyr Marcellus, Bishop of Apamea (389)

Pre-Schism Western saints

 Saint Eusebius of Rome, a priest in Rome who founded the 'church' called the titulis Eusebii after him (4th century)
 Saint Fachanan, Abbot of Rosscarbery, Cork, Ireland (c. 600)
 Saint Werenfrid, born in England, he worked with St Willibrord among the Frisians in the Netherlands (c. 760)
 Saint Eberhard of Einsiedeln Abbey (958)
 Saint Anastasius (Anastaz-Astrik), Archbishop of Esztergom (c. 1007)

Post-Schism Orthodox saints

 New Martyr Symeon of Trebizond, at Constantinople (1653)

New martyrs and confessors

 New Hieromartyr Basil (Bogoyavlensky), Archbishop of Chernigov, and with him:
 New Monkmartyr Matthew (Pomerantsev), Archimandrite, of Perm, and 
 New Martyr Alexei Zverev (1918)
 New Hieromartyr Vladimir Tsedrinsky,  Priest (1918)
 New Hieromartyrs Nazarius, Metropolitan of Kutaisi, Georgia, and with him:
 Priests Herman, Hierotheus, and Simon, and
 Archdeacon Bessarion (1924)
 Synaxis of the New Martyrs of Georgia ("New Martyrs of the Georgian Church"), who suffered under the Atheist Yoke (20th century)
 New Hieromartyrs Vladimir Smirnov and Nicholas Tolgsky, Priests (1937)
 Virgin-Martyr Eudokia, nun, and Martyr Theodore Zakharov (1937)
 New Hieromartyr Eleutherius (Pechennikov), Schema-Archimandrite, of the Holy Trinity Monastery (Smolensk) (1937)
 New Martyr Eva (Pavlova), Abbess of Holy Trinity Convent in Penza (Saratov) (1937)
 Venerable New Hiero-Confessor Alexander (Urodov), Archimandrite, of Sanaxar and Seven Lakes Monasteries (1961)

Other commemorations

 Translation of the True Cross back to the Palace.
 Translation of the relics (1091) of Venerable Theodosius of the Kiev Caves, Abbot (1074)
 Translation of the relics (1798) of Venerable Arcadius, monk of Novotorzhok (1077)
 Commemoration of the disciples of Saint Tikhon of Zadonsk:
 Monks Theophanes, Aaron, Nicander, Cosmas, and Metrophanes (18th-19th centuries)
 Repose of Archimandrite Theodosius (Makkos) of Bethany (1991)

Icons

 Icon of the Mother of God "the Converser" (1383)
 Icon of the Mother of God of Narva (1558)

Icon gallery

Notes

References

Sources
 August 14 / August 27. Orthodox Calendar (PRAVOSLAVIE.RU).
 August 27 / August 14. Holy Trinity Russian Orthodox Church (A parish of the Patriarchate of Moscow).
 August 14. OCA - The Lives of the Saints.
 The Autonomous Orthodox Metropolia of Western Europe and the Americas (ROCOR). St. Hilarion Calendar of Saints for the year of our Lord 2004. St. Hilarion Press (Austin, TX). p. 60.
 Menologion: The Fourteenth Day of the Month of August. Orthodoxy in China.
 August 14. Latin Saints of the Orthodox Patriarchate of Rome.
 The Roman Martyrology. Transl. by the Archbishop of Baltimore. Last Edition, According to the Copy Printed at Rome in 1914. Revised Edition, with the Imprimatur of His Eminence Cardinal Gibbons. Baltimore: John Murphy Company, 1916. p. 243.
 Rev. Richard Stanton. A Menology of England and Wales, or, Brief Memorials of the Ancient British and English Saints Arranged According to the Calendar, Together with the Martyrs of the 16th and 17th Centuries. London: Burns & Oates, 1892. pp. 393-394.

 Greek Sources
 Great Synaxaristes:  14 ΑΥΓΟΥΣΤΟΥ. ΜΕΓΑΣ ΣΥΝΑΞΑΡΙΣΤΗΣ.
  Συναξαριστής. 14 Αυγούστου. ECCLESIA.GR. (H ΕΚΚΛΗΣΙΑ ΤΗΣ ΕΛΛΑΔΟΣ).

 Russian Sources
  27 августа (14 августа). Православная Энциклопедия под редакцией Патриарха Московского и всея Руси Кирилла (электронная версия). (Orthodox Encyclopedia - Pravenc.ru).

August in the Eastern Orthodox calendar